The Antioch international movement of churches is a network of evangelical churches  headquartered in Waco, Texas founded in 1987 by the couple Jimmy and Laura Seibert. The movement is primarily focused on church planting and is non-denominational. The movement became well-known after two of its overseas missionaries, Dayna Curry and Heather Mercer, were imprisoned by the Taliban in Afghanistan for illegal missionary work, around the same time as the 9/11 attacks on the United States.

Origins 
Jimmy Siebert was the college department pastor of Highland Baptist Church (HBC) in Waco Texas.  The department grew large leading to the eventual formation as a separate church "Antioch Community Church" with the blessing of HBC.  It was announced as a multiplication event in 1987.

The movement's first discipleship school was held at Highland Baptist Church in Waco, Texas, led by Jimmy and Laura Seibert in 1987 while Jimmy was still working for HBC as the college pastor.    The first World Mandate conference was hosted in Waco, Texas in 1988 and following the collapse of the Soviet union, they began their first international church plants in former Soviet Union states.

Jimmy Seibert 
Jimmy Seibert is also the founder and senior pastor of Antioch Community Church in Waco, TX, and the president of Antioch Ministries International. Seibert graduated from Baylor University and a former member of the fraternity Kappa Omega Tau. The Seibert family currently live in Waco, Texas.

Despite a complete lack of seminary school training, his story of founding the movement is found in his first book, "The Church Can Change the World," which has been revamped in the book "Passion and Purpose." Seibert also co-authored "The Three Loves" with Larry Kreider.

Positions, beliefs, and practices 
Antioch Community Church in Waco has an official statement of faith available on their website. It is a non-denominational church. Robert Ewing strongly influenced the Antioch Movement as he was a mentor for Jimmy Seibert. Ewing was an independent non-denominational evangelist not associated with the Baptist Church nor traditions. Ewing used the term "New Testament Church" also heavily adopted by Siebert. All the churches of the movement have a distinct focus on the development of small group communities, called lifegroups or smallgroups (inspired from Acts 2:42-47).  The Baylor Magazine describes the Antioch church in Waco in this way: “Antioch engages members in daily Bible study and prayer, carried out individually and in the church's 100-plus small groups that meet during the week in homes and on Sunday mornings." Lifegroups follow a cell ministry model.

Stance against homosexuality and gay marriage 
The churches within the Antioch Movement recognize marriage as only between the uniting of one man and one woman in covenant commitment for a lifetime. Furthermore founder Jimmy Seibert has emphasized "...Homosexuality is a sin" and that it is a lie that homosexuality is not a sin. A believer in "gay conversion therapy", he attributes most homosexuality a result of some type of physical, sexual, mental abuse and has stated "for over 30 years — I have seen hundreds of people personally change their direction of same-sex attraction from a homosexual lifestyle to a heterosexual lifestyle."

As a result of this stance, HGTV celebrities Chip and Joanna Gaines from the show Fixer Upper, who attend the church, released a statement on it. It has also been reported a psychologist in Waco meets regularly with a group of self-described “Antioch survivors," noting former members' stories of crises of faith after being made to feel unwelcome by the Antioch Community Church in Waco, either for life decisions (declining to go on a mission) or for their identity (coming out as gay)

Stance against abortion and notion of pro-choice 
Antioch Waco's position paper states abortion, including abortifacient contraceptives, are wrong under any circumstances. Although Antioch describes a pregnancy resulting from incest, rape, specifically rape by her husband, as devastating, they do not believe these substantiate grounds for an abortion. Neither do they believe a woman should have the right to choose an abortion, describing the position of "choice" as inconsistent with the logic and the laws they hold dear.

Spanking children encouraged 
In their book, Parenting without Regret, Jimmy Seibert and Laura Seibert advocate spanking children as "ritualistic and instructive" for discipline.

Controversies and incidents

Systemic racism at Antioch Community Church 
Former Antiochers Gary and Brittany Wardlaw of the youtube channel "WardlawstoWaco" allege to having experienced pervasive oppression, silencing, and internally systemic racism by the leadership at Antioch Community Church. Gary and Brittany are trained therapists of African American descent.

Illegal missionaries in Afghanistan 
Antioch International actively sends independently covert missionaries in secret to countries and places that are dangerous and hostile to Christianity. Notable in the movement's history is the arrest and imprisonment of Heather Mercer and Dayna Curry by the Taliban on August 3, 2001 due to conducting evangelism and missionary work which was illegal in Afghanistan. Antioch Community Church responded to the crisis by creating a rotation of 24-hour prayer for Mercer and Curry's release. The crisis attracted the attention of international secular and religious media. The prayer vigil for Mercer and Curry lasted 104 days. At the news of the missionaries' release, Antioch responded with what was described by the LA Times as a "joyous fest" of prayer and worship. Mercer and Curry co-authored a book about their experience in Afghanistan, titled "Prisoners of Hope." As of 2021, Curry and Mercer still do work in Afghanistan serving on behalf of the Antioch Church Despite the dangers, Antioch Community Church continues to conduct evangelistic work and send missionaries to Afghanistan. In 2021, Dr. Mansoor Sawiz, a pediatrician who worked as an interpreter for Antioch Community Church has sent desperate messages to family in Texas and to the media for aid in leaving Afghanistan with his wife and five children. Ajmal Mayar, an engineer whose wife’s sister is married to Sawiz, said that the lives of Sawiz and his family have been upended and placed in danger since U.S. troops pulled out of Afghanistan and the extremist group has taken over.

Exploitative proselytization in Sri Lanka 
After the Sri Lankan tsunami of 2005, Antioch Community Church sent at least a dozen Americans under the pretense of humanitarian aid. Most American aid groups, including those affiliated with religious organizations, strictly avoid mixing aid with missionary work. Pat Murphy, 49, a leader of the team, claimed the group is nongovernmental organization, or NGO, and not a church group. But the church's own website said the Americans are one of four teams dispatched to Sri Lanka and Indonesia who have convinced dozens of people to "come to Christ." Rev. Sarangika Fernando, a local Methodist minister, accused the Americans of exploiting traumatized people. Antioch's aggressive proselytization have also angered and alarmed other humanitarian aid groups, who feared backlash.

Pastor arrested for prostitution 
In 2017, pastor Edward Ignacio Espinosa was arrested for patronizing an illicit massage parlor. Upon his confession, Pastor Espinosa was placed on administrative leave from Antioch Community Church and was later allowed to resign. Antioch Community Church’s own anti-human trafficking ministry, UnBound, assisted the women who were found at the massage parlor that Espinosa visited. Espinosa was on staff with Antioch’s Community Outreach Ministry for eight years.

Aggressive church planting / gentrification 
With "church planting" and expansionism as part of the core values of Antioch Waco, along with their close association with celebrity home renovation and redecoration entrepreneurs Chip and Joanna Gains, Antioch has been criticized for aggressively gentrifying their surrounding neighborhoods. Antioch Movement’s All Peoples Church is in the process of a contentious battle to plant themselves in the predominantly Jewish neighborhood of Del Cerro, in San Diego. A number of Del Cerro residents oppose this "mega project" in a campaign called "Save Del Cerro." All People’s Pastor Robert Herber, has empathetically spoken about a “revival” of the city, and specifically referenced the “Jews of Del Cerro”. Capitalizing on church networking as a means for creating internal upward mobility. On one expansionist project, Antioch intends to spend $11 million dollars on infrastructure alone. The Waco neighborhood, in particular, has been in focus, where journalist Anne Helen Petersen argues that Waco's diversity is not reflected in Antioch Community Church's white majority makeup.

Mosaic-Neumos dispute and fallout 
In 2008, a church plant of Antioch Community Church called Mosaic Community Church was characterized as "forcefully" inserting itself into the Capital Hill neighborhood of Seattle, Washington. Initially, the nightclub Neumos had agreed to rent out their space to the church. While Pastor Jady Griffin stated that his church is "open to everyone," several members of the MCC revealed that gays would not be accepted at the church. After local nightclub owners and residents had discovered what they viewed as Mosaic's vague, misleading, and ultimately "homophobic" beliefs, the nightclub has since denied the church plant's lease and have severed all ties.

Cult allegations 
There have been many reviews and personal testimonials on blogs, articles, Google Maps, and reddit that allege Antioch International Ministries and Antioch Waco of being a cult. One former member outlines brainwashing techniques, manipulation, strict rules, and people with their own "Antioch lingo" code speak. She describes being part of a certain target audience that Antioch will "prey" upon: young, seeking, vulnerable, on the "fringes." In her blog, another former member has described her experience as "toxic" and "abusive." One journalist even staked her career on the dangers of Antioch. It also reports a psychologist in town meets regularly with a group of self-described “Antioch survivors," noting former members' stories of crises of faith after being made to feel unwelcome by the church, either for life decisions (declining to go on a mission) or for their identity (coming out as gay).

Forced exorcism 
Former member Becky Oberg was kicked out of the Antioch Community church in the late ’90s after she was diagnosed with schizophrenia. “They thought I was possessed by a demon,” says Becky, adding that church leaders told her it was her fault and tried to treat her with an exorcism. “They pinned me to my floor and yelled for Satan to leave. They want you to confess your sin and be healed or cast out the demons.” However, in an interview, Seibert denied this and goes on to say they don’t use the term “exorcism” but they do recognize “demonic oppression.”

West LA pastor resigns 
On June 19, 2019 the Antioch affiliate church planter and founding pastor, Lawrence Huey, announced his stepping down from lead pastor of Epicentre West LA; he went on to accept a lower administrative position at a different church network, Chris Rattay succeeding his position at Epicentre West LA.

Affiliated churches 
In 1998, the Antioch Community Church in Waco sent out its first U.S. church planting team to Boston, Massachusetts.  The next church was planted in 2001 in Dallas, TX. Since then, churches have been planted across the United States with a vision to see more reproducing churches established internationally.  Many of these churches are now planting churches of their own, both in the United States and in other nations. As of 2022, the Antioch Movement’s public network list claims "over 40 churches in the United States" (see below). Internationally, their public listing claims "more than 80 additional locations worldwide" despite listing only 7. The remaining international churches are unlisted non-transparent black sites due to security concerns inherent with some international mission work.

Their 2022 North American public list is as follows:
 Antioch Phoenix
 Antioch Little Rock
 Antioch Northwest Arkansas
 All Peoples Church (San Diego)
 Antioch Fullerton
 Epicentre Church (Pasadena)
 Epicentre West LA
 Hope Community Church (Los Angeles)
 Antioch Ft. Collins
 Antioch Washington D.C.
 Antioch Indianapolis
 Antioch Wichita
 Antioch Baton Rouge
 Antioch New Orleans
 Antioch Beverly
 Antioch Brighton
 Antioch Waltham
 All Peoples Tijuana
 Antioch Ann Arbor
 Antioch Detroit
 Paradox Church (Warren)
 Waypoint Church (Omaha)
 Antioch Boone
 Antioch Raleigh
 Antioch Norman
 Antioch Oklahoma City
 Antioch Central Houston
 Antioch College Station
 Antioch Dallas
 Antioch Ft. Worth
 Antioch Galveston
 Antioch Houston
 Antioch North Austin
 Antioch South Austin
 Antioch Waco
 CrossBridge Community Church (San Antonio)
 Antioch Salt Lake City
 Mosaic Community Church North Seattle
 Mosaic Community Church Eastside (Seattle)

Their 2022 international public list is as follows:
 Antioch Sheffield
Antioch Aberdeen
Antioch Banff
Antioch Elgin
 Antioch Cape Town
 Antioch Stellenbosch
 Antioch Mongolia.

Related ministries 
 Living Hope Ministries, a gay conversion therapy organization, are direct partners with churches of the Antioch Movement: Antioch Waco, Antioch Community Church Bryan, Antioch Norman, and All Peoples Church (San Diego). They follow a popular ex-gay curriculum called "Living Waters" produced by Desert Stream Ministries. In spite of being heavily criticized for their (now banned) gay conversion therapy web app, Living Hope continues to practice and preach conversion therapy.
 Antioch Ministries International, a “non-profit church-planting organization affiliated with Antioch Community Church”
 Acts of Mercy International, "Acts of Mercy is the relief and development arm of the Antioch International Movement of Churches."
 STARS Mentoring Project
 Restoration Gateway, a church planting and orphanage project located in Uganda
 Haiti Transformed, a ministry committed to partner with the Haitian people to see their region transformed and redeveloped located in Laforeny, Haiti. In 2011, Haiti Transformed constructed over 100 homes in Laferony, over 30 of which were completed through a partnership with the Passion Movement.
 World Mandate, a conference “for anyone who wants to worship God and change the world” World Mandate is a popular conference typically hosted at Baylor University's Ferrell Center (when available, which was not the case in 2016). The event is known for its live worship and popular conference speakers, which have included Francis Chan, Louie Giglio, Christine Caine, Max Lucado, and Jackie Pullinger. The conference began in 1989 with 60 people and now draws thousands of attendees. World Mandate focuses on encouraging young people to pray and engage with international missionary work.
 UnBound is an anti-slavery and anti-trafficking ministry headquartered at Antioch Waco and has local chapters around the world. The organisation specializes in prevention, professional training, and survivor advocacy.

References

External links 
 
 World Mandate
 Antioch Church Planting Resources



Evangelical organizations established in the 20th century
Christian organizations based in the United States
1987 establishments in Texas
Non-denominational Evangelical unions